Killingly Pond State Park is a public recreation area encompassing  in the town of Killingly, Connecticut. The state park sits on the western side of Killingly Pond, a  body of water that straddles the state line between Connecticut and Rhode Island. The park offers boating, fishing, hiking, and hunting.

References

External links
Killingly Pond State Park Connecticut Department of Energy and Environmental Protection

State parks of Connecticut
Parks in Windham County, Connecticut
Killingly, Connecticut
Ponds of Connecticut
Bodies of water of Windham County, Connecticut